Thomas VanMetre or Vanmetre House is a historic home located near Martinsburg, Berkeley County, West Virginia, USA. It was built in 1838 and is a two-story, five bay, red brick vernacular "I"-house. It has a side gable roof and a single bay, pedimented portico supported by Doric order columns.  Also on the property is summer kitchen (c. 1838).

It was listed on the National Register of Historic Places in 2010.

References

Houses on the National Register of Historic Places in West Virginia
Houses in Berkeley County, West Virginia
National Register of Historic Places in Berkeley County, West Virginia
Houses completed in 1838
I-houses in West Virginia